The 300 metres hurdles (also spelled 300 meters hurdles in American English) is an athletics or track and field event. It is a 300 meter version of the International event the 400 metres hurdles. It is a standard event under the NFHS in American high school competition and a championship level event in Masters athletics. The two iterations of the event vary somewhat.  Common to all long hurdling events, the distance between hurdles is 35 metres.

High school
The high school version uses a standard 45 meter start to the first hurdle.  Thus the high school race is equivalent to beginning of a standard 400 meter hurdle race, but its placement on the track is shifted 100 meters around the track so it finishes at the common finish line on the straightaway, where the longer race would reach the same point near the end of the second turn.  There are 8 hurdles in the high school version, the last hurdle just 10 meters before the finish line.

High schools began adopting the longer hurdle event state by state starting in the 1960s.  At the time, most which school competition was using United States customary units, so the race was the 330 yard hurdles and since that occurred before Title IX, competition was only for boys.  By the mid-1970s girls competition had been added, but girls events were still undergoing a stage of evolution.  Essentially the administrators did not know the capabilities of women and were overcautious not to put them into too difficult events.  Metrication finally took hold in the NFHS in 1980, the last major sports governing body to adopt metric distances.  The official distance became 300 meters, but many competitions continued to be in yards because the tracks were still marked for that distance.

Hurdle heights also have undergone a period of evolution.  Until 1984, boys ran over low hurdles 30" in height.  When girls were introduced to the event around 1981, they ran the same height as the boys until the boys height was raised to the full intermediate hurdle height of 36" for the 1984 season.

Record progression
All United States national record holders have been from California.  Gayle Kellon is credited with the first record in 1982 at 41.09, set at the CIF California State Meet.  Leslie Maxie improved upon the record in 1984, taking the record first to 40.90 then to 40.18.  Her record held for 17 years until Lashinda Demus took the record below 40 to 39.98 in 2001, which remained until 2017 when Sydney McLaughlin broke it with a time of 38.90 at the Arcadia Invitational. She broke the national record by over a second.

Danny Harris had the low hurdle mark at 35.52, set in 1983 (just one year before he won the Olympic silver medal) when the  height was terminated.  The following year, George Porter ran 36.10 over the  intermediate hurdles, but his 35.32 in 1985 is the first recognized record.  That record held for 22 years until Jeshua Anderson finally nudged it down to 35.28 in 2007.  Chasing Anderson to his record was sophomore Reggie Wyatt, who (after losing his junior year to ineligibility) took the record to 35.02 in 2009.  All records took place in the finals of the CIF California State Meet except Porter's 35.32, which was set the week before qualifying to the meet.  Wyatt set his record in the preliminary round anticipating his successful attempt to double in the 400 meters.

Masters athletics
The Masters version of the race is different.  The distance from the start line to the first hurdle is 50 metres, which makes all the hurdle marks in the same place as the last seven hurdles of the standard 400-metre version, thus Masters only go over seven hurdles.  While men of all ages have run over 300 hurdles, the youngest official division to use the distance is M60.  M60 and M65 run over 30-inch (76.2 cm) barriers, M70 and M75 run over 27-inch barriers.  Prior to 2010, older age divisions also did 300 hurdles, though the number of competitors was small.  In 2010, M80+ and women's W70+ moved to doing a 200-metre race over the last five barriers of either race, thus retiring the 300 hurdles for those divisions.  By that time, 27-inch hurdles were embedded in the rulebook.

Women also do the 300 hurdles, W50 to W65 divisions.  Like the men, the W50 and W55 divisions do 30-inch hurdles, W60 and W65 do  (27 inch) hurdles, and W70+ do the 200-metre version over 27-inch hurdles.

Occasionally the event is held for top level athletes.  Those races follow the Masters athletics model of the event over seven hurdles.

27-inch hurdles
The idea of using 27-inch (68.6 cm) hurdles was introduced in Europe in 2000. The increment does not exist on standard hurdles, which caused resistance from some NGBs, but the rules were adopted worldwide.  Many modern hurdles will not go to that height or would at least require modification to cut the hurdle.  Most facilities that have spent thousands of dollars to buy regulation hurdles would certainly not let their hurdles be damaged like this. Since it is a requirement, major championship meets have purchased a few sets of modern modified hurdles, which then creates the logistical problem of shipping these few hurdles between meets in order for the competitors to have an opportunity to race over proper hurdles. As a substitute, many older hurdle designs are easier to modify to get to the proper height and most facilities are less protective of the old, rusty hurdles in the junk pile. Also many training hurdles (used to teach smaller, youth beginners) will go to 27 inches and lower.

Progression
The world record progressions for M60, M65 and M70 were dominated by Jack Greenwood for a decade as he passed through each division.  Each was surpassed by Guido Müller when he reached the same age divisions.  Müller's M60 record is 42.31; M65 is 43.88 and M70 is 45.24.  Greenwood retired before reaching the M75 division, Müller turned 75 in December 2013.  Thus far the M75 world record is held by Earl Fee after being held for a long time by Albertus Van Zyl.  Fee's record is currently 52.91.  Müller is betting he will beat Fee's record.  Before the event was retired for those divisions, in the M80 division, Fee had just beaten Dan Bulkley's decade-long record by running 56.92. The M85 division was held by Hugo Delgado Flores at 1:07.99 and Ilmari Koppinen had run 2:01.71 at M90.

The W50 division has been led by Brenda Parkinson and Jan Hynes before Christine Müller set the current world record at 45.05.  Corrie Roovers dominated the W55 and W60 division lists for a decade until Phil Raschker took the W55 with a 49.14 in 2002.  After another decade, Jane Horder advanced the W55 record to 49.00 in 2012.  By the time Raschker reached W60, Marge Allison had already put the record out to 51.64.  Allison also has the W65 record at 54.06.  Florence Meiler had the W70 record at 1:07.16 and Johnnye Valien had the W75 record at 1:29.00 before the event was retired.

All-time top 25
ht = hand timing
Mx = mixed race
i = indoor performance
OT = oversized track (> 200 m in circumference)

Men

Notes
Below is a list of other times equal or superior to 35.40:
Karsten Warholm also ran 33.78 (2020), 34.26  (2018i).
Chris Rawlinson also ran 34.59 (2000).
Thomas Goller also ran a hand-timed 35.0 (2000), 35.3 (1999).
Ockert Cilliers also ran a hand-timed 35.3 (2005).
Silvio Schirrmeister also ran 35.3 (ht) (2011, 2013), 35.4 (ht) (2012).
Kariem Hussein also ran 35.34 (2015).

Women

Notes
Below is a list of other times equal or superior to 39.69:
Femke Bol also ran 38.55 (2020).
Zuzana Hejnová also ran 38.75 (2013), 38.91 (2011), 38.98 (2017), 39.21 (2015), 39.44 (2016), 39.61 (2019).
Léa Sprunger also ran 39.25 (2020), 39.29 (2017), 39.54 (2020).
Jessie Knight also ran 39.35 (2020).
Stephanie Kampf also ran hand-timed 39.4 (2003).
Marzia Caravelli also ran 39.56 (2013).
Ayomide Folorunso also ran 39.60 (2022).

References

External links
NFHS National High School rule book

Events in track and field
Hurdling